Minions is a 2015 American computer-animated comedy film produced by Illumination Entertainment and distributed by Universal Pictures. It is the spin-off/prequel and the third installment overall in the Despicable Me franchise. Directed by Kyle Balda (in Balda's directorial debut) and Pierre Coffin, produced by Chris Meledandri and Janet Healy, and written by Brian Lynch, it stars the voices of Coffin as the Minions (including Kevin, Stuart, and Bob), Sandra Bullock, Jon Hamm, Michael Keaton, Allison Janney, Steve Coogan, Jennifer Saunders, and is narrated by Geoffrey Rush. In the film, the Minions search for their replaceable evil master after accidentally killing all of those in history.

Minions debuted in London on June 11, 2015, and was released in the United States on July 10. It received mixed reviews from critics, who praised the animation, voice acting, and score, but criticized the character development and humor, which some called unfunny and inappropriate. It was a financial success at the box office, earning $1.159 billion worldwide, and became the fifth-highest-grossing film of 2015, the 10th-highest-grossing film of all time, the second-highest-grossing animated film of all time during its theatrical run, and is to date the highest-grossing animated film not released by Walt Disney Pictures. A sequel, Minions: The Rise of Gru, was released in 2022.

Plot

Minions are small, yellow pill-shaped creatures which have existed since the beginning of time, evolving from single-celled organisms into beings which exist only to serve history's most evil masters, but they accidentally end up killing all their masters: rolling a T. rex into a volcano, letting a caveman get eaten by a bear, crushing a Pharaoh to death with a pyramid, and exposing Count Dracula to sunlight. They are driven into isolation after firing a cannon at Napoleon while in Russia, and start a new life inside a cave, but after many years, the Minions become sad and unmotivated without a master to serve. However, three Minions named Kevin, Stuart and Bob decide to go out on a quest to find a new master.

The three journey in 1968 to New York City and go into a department store for the night; they stumble upon a hidden commercial broadcast advertising Villain-Con, an Orlando convention for all villains. The next day they hitchhike a ride with the Nelsons, a family of thieves. At the convention, they meet Scarlet Overkill, the world's first female supervillain, who unexpectedly hires them and takes them to her home in London. They phone the rest of the Minions to get them to join. Scarlet plans to steal the Imperial State Crown from Queen Elizabeth II, promising to reward the Minions if they succeed, but also threatening to kill them if they fail.

Scarlet's husband Herb supplies them with inventions to aid in the heist, but they are nearly caught while breaking into the Tower of London. During the subsequent chase, Bob runs into the Sword in the Stone and pulls the sword free to defend himself and his friends, removing the Queen from the throne and making Bob the new King. Enraged that someone else accomplished her dream of stealing the throne, Scarlet confronts Bob, who voluntarily abdicates the throne in her favor. Undeterred, Scarlet imprisons Kevin, Stuart and Bob in a dungeon, where Herb attempts to torture the trio, but they escape with the intention to apologize to Scarlet at her coronation.

After making their way to Westminster Abbey, Kevin, Stuart and Bob interrupt the coronation by inadvertently dropping a chandelier on Scarlet. Mistaking the accident for an assassination attempt, Scarlet angrily orders the trio's execution and has other villains chase them through the streets of London during a thunderstorm. Stuart and Bob are captured, while Kevin hides in a pub and sees Scarlet on television, who declares that she will kill Stuart and Bob if Kevin does not show up by dawn. With the villains still searching for him, Kevin sneaks into Scarlet's castle to steal weapons and triggers a machine Herb was building, causing him to grow in size into a giant. Kevin tramples through London, rescues his friends, and battles Scarlet, just as the other Minions turn up in the city. Scarlet tries to eradicate them by firing a massive missile, but Kevin swallows it. Scarlet and Herb attempt to escape with her rocket dress, only for Kevin to hold onto it and get pulled into the sky. The missile explodes, seemingly killing Kevin, Scarlet, and Herb. As the Minions mourn the loss of their leader, Kevin survives as he returns to his normal size.

The Queen gets her throne and crown back. She rewards Bob with a tiny crown for his teddy bear Tim, Stuart with an electric guitar, and Kevin with a knighthood. Scarlet and Herb, still alive, steal the crown again, only to be stopped by a young Gru, who fires a freeze ray at them and flees with the crown on a rocket-powered motorbike. The Minions, deciding Gru is the new master they were looking for, begin to follow him.

Voice cast

 Sandra Bullock as Scarlet Overkill, the world's first female supervillain and Herb's wife
 Jon Hamm as Herb Overkill, a genius inventor and Scarlet's husband
 Michael Keaton as Walter Nelson, Madge's thief husband and Tina, Walter Jr. and Binky's father
 Allison Janney as Madge Nelson, Walter's thief wife and Tina, Walter Jr. and Binky's mother
 Steve Coogan as a Tower Guard
 Coogan also voices Professor Flux, a scientist
 Jennifer Saunders as Elizabeth II, the Queen of the United Kingdom
 Pierre Coffin as the yellow, small Minions, including:
 Kevin, the leader of the Minion trio, out to find a new master
 Stuart, a musician, and the slacker of the Minion trio
 Bob, the youngest and smallest of the Minion trio
 Geoffrey Rush as the Narrator

Additionally, Steve Carell reprises his role as Gru, who appears at the end of the film in his younger form. Other cast members include Katy Mixon as Tina Nelson, Walter and Madge's thief daughter; Michael Beattie as Walter Nelson Jr., Walter and Madge's thief son (Beattie also voices a VNC announcer); Hiroyuki Sanada as Dumo, a sumo fighter villain; and Dave Rosenbaum as Fabrice, Scarlet's personal stylist.

Production

Development
Universal Pictures and Illumination Entertainment first announced in July 2012, that the Minions from the franchise would get their own spin-off film, scheduled for a 2014 release. Brian Lynch was asked to write the film's screenplay, due to his prior work writing for the theme park ride Despicable Me Minion Mayhem. Pierre Coffin became director again with newcomer Kyle Balda as the co-director, marking the first film in the franchise where Chris Renaud is not a director. Eric Guillon returned for the film but was not an art director, as he was the character and production designer for the film.

Casting
In February 2013, Sandra Bullock joined the cast to voice Scarlet Overkill, with Jon Hamm joining two months later as her husband Herb Overkill. Bullock was paid $10 million for her involvement. In March 2015, Allison Janney was cast as Madge Nelson. Pierre Coffin, the film's director, reprised his role as the Minions. This is one of the films in the franchise in which Coffin is the sole actor and the first film where Chris Renaud doesn't serve as a director, but an executive producer. Kyle Balda served as a co-director along with Coffin. Jennifer Saunders was cast to voice Queen Elizabeth II.

Music

The official soundtrack for the film was released on July 10, 2015, by Back Lot Music. The soundtrack also features the film's original music, composed by Heitor Pereira.

Marketing
Bloomberg News estimated that Universal Pictures spent $593 million in ads and promotions for the film. Television advertisements were spent at $26.1 million. Universal described the film's promotional campaign as the "largest and most comprehensive" in its history. In April 2015, Pantone announced the creation of a new official Pantone color, "Minion Yellow", in partnership with Illumination. A series of comics and graphic novels based on the film were published by Titan Comics and launched in June. McDonald's released a promotion for the film's toy set offered in their Happy Meals between June and July.

Release

Theatrical
Minions premiered at the Odeon Leicester Square in London on June 11, 2015, followed by a premiere on June 27, at the Shrine Auditorium in Los Angeles. The film was originally scheduled for general release on December 19, 2014, but it was pushed back to July 10, 2015, due to Universal's satisfaction with the successful release of Despicable Me 2 (2013) and desire to exploit fully the merchandising potential of Minions.

Home media
Universal Pictures Home Entertainment released Minions on Blu-ray and DVD on December 8, 2015. Physical copies contain three short films: Cro Minion, Competition, and Binky Nelson Unpacified.

Reception

Box office
Minions earned $336 million in the United States and Canada and $823.4 million in other territories, for a worldwide total of $1.159 billion. It was the fifth-highest-grossing film of 2015, the 10th-highest-grossing film of all time, and the second-highest-grossing animated film of all time. On August 28, 2015, Minions passed the $1 billion mark at the worldwide box office, becoming the third animated film to cross that milestone after Toy Story 3 (2010) and Frozen (2013). Deadline Hollywood calculated the film's net profit as $502 million, accounting for production budgets, marketing, talent participations, and other costs; box office grosses and home media revenues placed it second on their list of 2015's "Most Valuable Blockbusters".

The film was released with The Gallows and Self/less on July 10, 2015. Minions earned $46 million on its first day, including $6.2 million from Thursday night previews. During its opening weekend, the film earned $115.2 million from 4,301 theaters, making it the second-highest opening weekend for an animated film, behind Shrek the Third (2007). Moreover, it had the largest opening weekend for a prequel, breaking the previous record held by Star Wars: Episode III – Revenge of the Sith (2005). Its second weekend earnings dropped by 57 percent to $50.2 million, and followed by another $22 million the third weekend. Minions completed its theatrical run in the United States and Canada on December 17, 2015.

Worldwide, Minions debuted in 44 markets on June 18, 2015, and later a total of 66 countries by July 11. The film earned $12.5 million in its opening weekend from four countries, and in its second, Minions made $37.6 million in 10 markets. Its top international markets were the United Kingdom ($73.1 million), China ($63.47 million), and Germany ($63.46 million).

Critical response
Its critical consensus reads, "The Minions' brightly colored brand of gibberish-fueled insanity stretches to feature length in their self-titled Despicable Me spinoff, with uneven but often hilarious results." Metacritic (which uses a weighted average) assigned Minions a score of 56 out of 100 based on 35 critics, indicating "mixed or average reviews". Audiences polled by CinemaScore gave the film an average grade of "A" on an A+ to F scale.

Jesse Hassenger of The A.V. Club gave the film a C, saying "Minions has idiosyncratic roots, but it's a franchise play all the way. Finally, even 5-year-olds have their own movie that mechanically cashes in on something they loved when they were younger". Michael O'Sullivan of The Washington Post gave the film two and a half stars out of four, saying, "I, too, once enjoyed the Minions, in the small doses that they came in. But the extra-strength Minions is, for better or for worse, too much of a good thing". Brian Truitt of USA Today gave the film two and a half stars out of four, saying, "Brian Lynch's screenplay features a series of amusing sight gags and physical comedy that mostly hits; watching the Minions play Polo while riding Corgis is an exercise in cuteness". Tom Russo of The Boston Globe gave the film two stars out of four, saying, "Impressive as it is that the filmmakers get so much comedic mileage out of their characters' half-intelligible prattling, the conventional dialogue is bafflingly flat". Manohla Dargis of The New York Times said, "While Minions explores nominally new narrative ground, it folds neatly into a series that now includes two features, various shorts, books, video games, sheet music and a theme park attraction. So, you know, different but also the same".

Tom Long of The Detroit News gave the film a B, saying "Minions is every bit as cute as it's supposed to be, a happily empty-headed animated frolic that rarely pauses to take a breath". Peter Travers of Rolling Stone gave the film two stars out of four, saying, "It's not whether this prequel can mint money; that's a given. The questions is: Can the minions carry a movie all by their mischievous mini-selves? 'Fraid not". Kerry Lengel of The Arizona Republic gave the film two-and-a-half stars out of five, saying, "Despite the dizzying pace of carefully calibrated incongruities, Minions somehow never generates more than the occasional chuckle". Christopher Orr of The Atlantic said, "There's plenty of high-velocity comic inanity on display to keep kids happily diverted. But the movie's major flaw is an extension of its own premise: Search as they may, the minions never find a villain worthy of their subservience". Liam Lacey of The Globe and Mail gave the film two stars out of four, saying, "With its episodic stream of slapstick gags, Minions has moments of piquant absurdity, but mostly its shrill-but-cutesy anarchy works as a visual sugar rush for the preschool set".

Accolades

Sequel

Minions was followed by Minions: The Rise of Gru (2022). In the film, an eleven-year-old Gru plans to become a supervillain with the help of his Minions, which leads to a showdown with a malevolent team, the Vicious 6.

Notes

References

External links
 
 
 

2010s American animated films
2010s English-language films
2015 comedy films
2015 computer-animated films
2015 films
American children's animated adventure films
American children's animated comedy films
American computer-animated films
American heist films
Animated films about revenge
Animated films set in London
Animated films set in New York City
Animation based on real people
Cultural depictions of Elizabeth II
Depictions of Napoleon on film
Despicable Me
Film spin-offs
Films about Elizabeth II
Films about size change
Films directed by Pierre Coffin
Films produced by Chris Meledandri
Films produced by Janet Healy
Films scored by Heitor Pereira
Films set in 1968
Films set in New York City
Films set in Orlando, Florida
Films set in the United Kingdom
Illumination (company) animated films
IMAX films
Universal Pictures animated films
Universal Pictures films